Stefan Deak (Serbian Cyrillic: Стефан Деак, Hungarian: Deák István; born 23 March 1991) is a Serbian footballer who plays as a central defender in Hungary for Mosonmagyaróvár.

Club career 
Deák made his senior debuts with local FK Veternik in 2009. In January 2010, he signed with PFC Spartak Nalchik, being assigned #23 jersey. However, he failed to appear with the club, only being on the bench in a match against FC Zenit Saint Petersburg on 3 October.

On 21 January 2011, Deák signed a four-and-a-half-year deal with Deportivo de La Coruña, being assigned to the reserves. However, after a below-average debut and struggling with muscular injuries, he was loaned to Hapoel Rishon LeZion F.C. in July 2012, later joining BFC Siófok, also on loan.

In June 2013, Deák was called up to Depor first team, taking part of the club's pre-season squad. On 12 September, he finally made his debut with the main squad, starting and being sent off in a 2–2 draw against Córdoba CF for the season's Copa del Rey.

On 27 August 2014 Deák rescinded his link with the Galicians.

References

External links 
 
 Nemzeti Sport profile 
 

1991 births
Living people
People from Ruma
Hungarians in Vojvodina
Serbian footballers
Association football defenders
FK Veternik players
Deportivo Fabril players
Hapoel Rishon LeZion F.C. players
BFC Siófok players
Deportivo de La Coruña players
Mosonmagyaróvári TE 1904 footballers
Budapest Honvéd FC players
FK Napredak Kruševac players
MTK Budapest FC players
Szeged-Csanád Grosics Akadémia footballers
Israeli Premier League players
Serbian SuperLiga players
Nemzeti Bajnokság I players
Nemzeti Bajnokság II players
Serbian expatriate footballers
Expatriate footballers in Russia
Expatriate footballers in Spain
Expatriate footballers in Israel
Expatriate footballers in Hungary
Serbian expatriate sportspeople in Russia
Serbian expatriate sportspeople in Spain
Serbian expatriate sportspeople in Israel
Serbian expatriate sportspeople in Hungary
PFC Spartak Nalchik players